Following is a List of senators of Seine, people who have represented the department of Seine in the Senate of France. The Seine and Seine-et-Oise departments were combined and then broken into smaller departments in 1968.

Third Republic

Senators for Seine under the French Third Republic were:

 Ferdinand Hérold (1876–1882)
 Victor Hugo (1876–1885)
 Alphonse Peyrat (1876–1890)
 Henri Tolain (1876–1897)
 Charles de Freycinet (1876–1920)
 Jean Labordère (1882–1884)
 Jacques Songeon (1885–1889)
 Georges Martin (1885–1891)
 François Poirrier (1889–1917)
 René Goblet (1891–1893)
 Arthur Ranc (1891–1900)
 Alexandre Lefèvre (1891–1914)
 Charles Floquet (1894–1896)
 Désiré Barodet (1896–1900)
 Paul Strauss (1897–1936)
 Alfred Thuillier (1899–1909)
 Athanase Bassinet (1899–1914)
 Charles Expert-Bezançon (1900–1909)
 Léon Piettre (1900–1909)
 Alfred Mascuraud (1905–1926)
 Auguste Ranson (1907–1927)
 Adolphe Maujan (1909–1914)
 Auguste Gervais (1909–1917)
 Léon Barbier (1909–1919)
 Paul Magny (1914–1925)
 Charles Deloncle (1914–1936)
 Théodore Steeg (1914–1940)
 André Berthelot (1920–1927)
 Louis Dausset (1920–1927)
 Raphaël Levy (1920–1927)
 Ernest Billiet (1920–1927)
 Alexandre Millerand (1925–1927)
 Amédée Dherbecourt (1927–1936)
 Lucien Voilin (1927–1936)
 Pierre Laval (1927–1936)
 Charles Auray (1927–1938)
 André Morizet (1927–1940)
 Auguste Mounié (1927–1940)
 Alexandre Bachelet (1927–1940)
 Marcel Cachin (1936–1940)
 Jean-Marie Clamamus (1936–1940)
 Eugène Fiancette (1936–1940)
 Henri Sellier (1936–1940)
 Paul Fleurot (1936–1940)
 Victor Constant (1938–1940)

Fourth Republic

Senators for Seine under the French Fourth Republic were:

 Max André (1946–1947)
 Marc Gerber (1946–1948)
 Léon Mauvais (1946–1948)
 Simone Rollin (1946–1948)
 Julien Brunhes (1946–1948) and 1952–1959
 Bernard Lafay (1946–1951)
 Marcel Renet (1946–1952)
 Georges Marrane (1946–1956)
 Henri Barré (1946–1958)
 Suzanne Girault (1946–1958)
 Marcelle Devaud (1946–1958)
 Gilberte Brossolette (1946–1958)
 Joanny Berlioz (1946–1958)
 Léo Hamon (1946–1958)
 Georges Laffargue (1946–1958)
 Jean Primet (1946–1958)
 Yvonne Dumont (1946–1959)
 Gabriel Ferrier (1947–1948)
 Édouard Corniglion-Molinier (1948–1951)
 Pierre de Gaulle (1948–1951)
 André Souquière (1948–1952)
 Jean Chaintron (1948–1958)
 Jacques Debu-Bridel (1948–1958)
 Henry Torrès (1948–1958)
 Jean Bertaud (1948–1959)
 Ernest Petit (1948–1959)
 Jean Fleury (1951–1952)
 Jean Guiter (1951–1952)
 Charles Deutschmann (1951–1958)
 Waldeck L'Huillier (1952–1959)
 Edmond Michelet (1952–1959)
 René Plazanet (1952–1959)
 Renée Dervaux (1956–1959)
 Jean Lolive (1958)
 Raymond Baudin (1958–1959)
 Raymond Bossus (1958–1959)
 Maurice Coutrot (1958–1959)
 Georges Dardel (1958–1959)
 André Fosset (1958–1959)
 Robert Francotte (1958–1959)
 Charles Fruh (1958–1959)
 Pierre Giraud (1958–1959)
 Joseph Lanet (1958–1959)
 Roger Ménager (1958–1959)
 Louis Talamoni (1958–1959)

Fifth Republic

Senators for Seine under the French Fifth Republic:

Edmond Barrachin
Jacques Baumel
Maurice Bayrou
Raymond Bossus
Julien Brunhes
Georges Cogniot
Maurice Coutrot
Georges Dardel
Renée Dervaux
Jacques Duclos
Jean Fleury
André Fosset
Charles Fruh
Jean Ganeval
Roger Garaudy
Raymond Guyot
Bernard Lafay
Joseph Lanet
Waldeck l'Huillier
Jacques Marette
Georges Marrane
Edmond Michelet
Dominique Pado
Ernest Petit
Jeannette Thorez Vermeersch
Jean-Louis Vigier

References

Sources